Graham Bizzell (19 November 1941 – 29 April 2014) was an Australian cricketer. He played thirty first-class matches for Queensland between 1961 and 1966. His grandson, Jack Wildermuth, has played Twenty20 International (T20I) cricket for Australia.

References

External links
 

1941 births
2014 deaths
Australian cricketers
Queensland cricketers